Persin is a fungicidal toxin present in the avocado. Persin is an oil-soluble compound structurally similar to a fatty acid, and it leaches into the body of the fruit from the seeds. 

The relatively low concentrations of persin in the ripe pulp of the avocado fruit is generally considered harmless to humans. Negative effects in humans are primarily in allergic individuals. When persin is consumed by domestic animals through the leaves or bark of the avocado tree, or skins and seeds of the avocado fruit, it is toxic and dangerous.

Pathology 
Consumption of the leaves and bark of the avocado tree, or the skin and pit of the avocado fruit have been shown to have the following effects:

In birds, which are particularly sensitive to the avocado toxin, the symptoms are: increased heart rate, myocardial tissue damage, labored breathing, disordered plumage, unrest, weakness, and apathy. High doses cause acute respiratory syndrome (asphyxia), with death approximately 12 to 24 hours after consumption.
Lactating rabbits and mice: non-infectious mastitis and agalactia after consumption of leaves or bark.
Rabbits: cardial arrhythmia, submandibular edema and death after consumption of leaves.
Cows and goats: mastitis, decreased milk production after consumption of leaves or bark.
Horses: clinical effects occur mainly in mares, and includes noninfectious mastitis, as well as occasional gastritis and colic. 
Cats, dogs: mild stomach upset may occur, with potential to cause heart damage.
Hares, pigs, rats, sheep, ostriches, chickens, turkeys and fish: symptoms of intoxication similar those described above. The lethal dose is not known; the effect is different depending upon the animal species.
Mice: non-fatal injury to the lactating mammary gland from 60 to 100 mg/kg Persin. Necrosis of myocardial fibres with 100 mg/kg Persin. 200 mg/kg lethal.

Additional pharmacology 
Animal studies show that exposure to persin leads to apoptosis in certain types of breast cancer cells. It has also been shown to enhance the cytotoxic effect of tamoxifen in vitro.  Persin is however highly insoluble in aqueous solutions and more research will be needed to put it into a soluble tablet form.

References 

Plant toxins
Veterinary toxicology
Acetate esters